The Australian Army is the principal land warfare force of Australia, a part of the Australian Defence Force (ADF) along with the Royal Australian Navy and the Royal Australian Air Force. The Army is commanded by the Chief of Army (CA), who is subordinate to the Chief of the Defence Force (CDF) who commands the ADF. The CA is also directly responsible to the Minister for Defence, with the Department of Defence administering the ADF and the Army.

Formed in 1901, as the Commonwealth Military Forces, through the amalgamation of the colonial forces of Australia following the Federation of Australia. Although Australian soldiers have been involved in a number of minor and major conflicts throughout Australia's history, only during the Second World War has Australian territory come under direct attack.

The Australian Army was initially composed almost completely of part–time soldiers, where the vast majority were in units of the Citizens Military Force (CMF or Militia) (1901–1980) during peacetime, with limits set on the regular Army. Since all reservists were barred from forcibly serving overseas, volunteer expeditionary forces (1st AIF, ANMEF, 2nd AIF) were formed to enable the Army to send large numbers of soldiers to serve overseas during periods of war. This period lasted from federation until post–1947, when a standing peacetime regular army was formed and the Australian Army Reserve (1980–present) began to decline in importance.

During its history, the Australian Army has fought in a number of major wars, including the Second Boer War, the First and Second World Wars, Korean War, Malayan Emergency, Indonesia-Malaysia Confrontation, Vietnam War, and more recently in Afghanistan and Iraq. Since 1947, the Australian Army has also been involved in many peacekeeping operations, usually under the auspices of the United Nations. Today, it participates in multilateral and unilateral military exercises and provides emergency disaster relief and humanitarian aid in response to domestic and international crises.

History

Formation 

Formed in March 1901, following federation, the Australian Army initially consisted of the six, disbanded and separate, colonial military forces' land components. Due to the Army being continuation of the colonial armies, it became immediately embroiled in conflict as contingents had been committed to fight for the United Kingdom of Great Britain and Ireland in the Second Boer War. The Army gained command of these contingents and even supplied federal units to reinforce their commitment at the request of the British government.

The Defence Act 1903, established the operation and command structure of the Australian Army. In 1911, the Universal Service Scheme was implemented, introducing conscription for the first time in Australia, with males aged 14–26 assigned into cadet and CMF units; though the scheme did not prescribe or allow overseas service outside the states and territories of Australia. This restriction would be primarily, and continually, bypassed through the process of raising separate volunteer forces until the mid-20th century; this solution was not without its drawbacks, as it caused logistical dilemmas.

World War I 

After the declaration of war on the Central Powers, the Australian Army raised the all volunteer First Australian Imperial Force (AIF) which had an initial recruitment of 52,561 out of a promised 20,000 men. A smaller expeditionary force, the Australian Naval and Military Expeditionary Force (ANMEF), dealt with the issue of the German Pacific holdings. ANMEF recruitment began on 10 August 1914, and operations started 10 days later. On 11 September, the ANMEF landed at Rabaul to secure German New Guinea, with no German outposts in the Pacific left by November 1914. During the AIF's preparations to depart Australia, the Ottoman Empire joined the Central Powers; thereby receiving declarations of war from the Allies of World War I in early November 1914.

After initial recruitment and training, the AIF departed for Egypt where they underwent further preparations, and where the Australian and New Zealand Army Corps (ANZAC) was formed. Their presence in Egypt was due to the planned Gallipoli campaign, an invasion of the Ottoman Empire via Gallipoli. On 25 April, the AIF landed at ANZAC Cove, which signaled the start of Australia's contribution to the campaign. Following little initial success, fighting quickly devolved into trench warfare, which precipitated a stalemate. On 15 December 1915, after eight months of fighting, the evacuation of Gallipoli commenced; it was completed 5 days later with no casualties recorded. After regrouping in Egypt, the AIF was split into two groups and further expanded with reinforcements. This division would see a majority of the Australian Light Horse fight the Ottomans in Arabia and the Levant, whereas
the rest of the AIF would go to the Western Front.

Western Front 

The AIF arrived in France with the 1st, 2nd, 4th and 5th Divisions; which comprised, in part, I ANZAC Corps and, in full, II ANZAC Corps. The 3rd Division would not arrive until November 1916, as it underwent training in England after its transfer from Australia. In July 1916, the AIF commenced operations with the Battle of the Somme, and more specifically with the Attack at Fromelles. Soon after, the 1st, 2nd and 4th Divisions became tied down in actions at the Battle of Pozières and Mouquet Farm. In around six weeks, the operations caused 28,000 Australian casualties. Due to these losses and pressure from the United Kingdom to maintain the AIF's manpower, Prime Minister Billy Hughes introduced the first conscription plebiscite. It was defeated by a narrow margin and created a bitter divide on the issue of conscription throughout the 20th century.

Following the German withdrawal to the Hindenburg Line in March 1917, which was better defended and eased manpower restraints, the first Australian assault on the Hindenburg Line occurred on 11 April 1917 with the First Battle of Bullecourt. On 20 September, the Australian contingent joined the Third Battle of Ypres with the Battle of Menin Road, and continued on to fight in the Battle of Polygon Wood, which lasted until 3 October; in total, these tow operations cost roughly 11,000 in Australian casualties. Until 15 November 1917, multiple attacks at the Battle of Broodseinde Ridge and the Battle of Passchendaele occurred, but, failed to take their objectives following the start of the rain and subsequent muddying of the fields.

On 21 March 1918, the Germans attempted a breakout through the Michael Offensive, which was part of the much larger German spring offensive; the AIF suffered 15,000 casualties due to this effort. During this operation, Australian troops conducted a series of local defences and offensives to hold and retake Villers–Brettoneux over the period 4 to 25 April 1918. After the cessation of offensives by the German Army, the Australian Corps began participating in "Peaceful penetration" operations, which were localised raids designed to harass and gain small tracts of territory; these proved so effective that several major operational objectives were captured.

On 4 July 1918, the Battle of Hamel saw the first successful use of tanks alongside Australians, with the battleplan of John Monash completed three minutes over the planned 90 minute operation. Following this success, the Battle of Amiens was launched on 8 August 1918, in conjunction with the Canadian Corps and the British III Corps, and concluded on 12 August 1918; General Erich Ludendorff described it as "the black day of the German Army". On 29 August 1918, following territorial advances and pursuits, the AIF attacked Pèronne and subsequently initiated the Battle of Mont St Quentin. Another operation around Épehy was planned for 18 September 1918, which aimed to retake the British trenches and, potentially, capture their most ambitious objective of the Hindenburg's outpost line – which they achieved.

Following news of a three-month furlough for certain soldiers, seven AIF battalions were disbanded; consequently, members of these battalions mutinied. Soon after the penetration of the Hindenburg Line, plans for the breakthrough of the main trench, with the Australian Corps as the vanguard, were completed. However, due to manpower issues, only the 3rd and 5th Divisions participated, with the American Expeditionary Forces' 27th and 30th Divisions given as reinforcements. On 29 September, following a three day long bombardment, the Battle of the Hindenburg Line commenced, wherein the corps attacked and captured more of the line. On 5 October 1918, after furious fighting, the Australian Corps was withdrawn from the front, as the entire corps had been operating continuously since 8 August 1918. They would not return to the battlefield, as Germany signed the Armistice of 11 November 1918 that ultimately ended the war on the Western Front.

Middle East 

The Australian mounted units, composed of the ANZAC Mounted Division and eventually the Australian Mounted Division, participated in the Sinai and Palestine campaign. They were originally stationed there to protect the Suez Canal from the Turks, and following the threat of its capture passing, they started offensive operations and helped in the re-conquest of the Sinai Desert. This was followed by the Battles of Gaza, wherein on the 31 October 1917 the 4th and 12th Light Horse took Beersheba through the last charge of the Light Horse. They continued on to capture Jerusalem on 10 December 1917 and then eventually Damascus on 1 October 1918 whereby, a few days later on 10 October 1918, the Ottoman Empire surrendered.

Interbellum 

Repatriation efforts were implemented between the armistice and the end of 1919, which occurred after the disbandment of the Australian Imperial Force. In 1921, CMF units were renumbered to that of the AIF, to perpetuate the honours and numerical identities of the units involved in WW1. During this period there was a complacency towards matters of defence, due to the devastating effects of the previous war on the Australian psyche. Following the election of Prime Minister James Scullin in 1929, two events occurred that substantially affected the armed forces: conscription was abolished and the economic effects of the Great Depression started to be felt in Australia. The economic ramifications of the depression led to decisions that decreased defence expenditure and manpower for the army. Since conscription was repealed, to reflect the new volunteer nature of the Citizens Forces, the CMF was renamed to the Militia.

World War II 

Following the declaration of war on Nazi Germany and her allies by the United Kingdom, and the subsequent confirmation by Prime Minister Robert Menzies on 3 September 1939, the Australian Army raised the Second Australian Imperial Force, a 20,000-strong volunteer expeditionary force, which initially consisted of the 6th Division; later increased to include the 7th and 9th Divisions, alongside the 8th Division which was sent to Singapore. In October 1939, compulsory military training recommenced for unmarried men aged 21, who had to complete three months of training.

The 2nd AIF commenced its first operations in North Africa with Operation Compass, that began with the Battle of Bardia. This was followed by supplying Australian units to defend against the Axis in the Battle of Greece. After the evacuation of Greece, Australian troops took part in the Battle of Crete which, though more successful, still failed and another withdrawal was ordered. During the Greek Campaign, the Allies were pushed back to Egypt and the Siege of Tobruk began. Tobruk's primary defence personnel were Australians of the 9th Division; the so-called 'Rats of Tobruk'. Additionally, the AIF participated in the Syria–Lebanon campaign. The 9th Division fought in the First and Second Battle of El Alamein before also being shipped home to fight the Japanese.

Pacific 

In December 1941, following the Bombing of Pearl Harbour, Australia declared war on Japan. Consequently, the AIF was requested to return home, as the subsequent rapid conquest of Southeast Asia extremely concerned Australian policymakers, and the militia was mobilised. After the Fall of Singapore, and the consequent capture of the entire 8th Division as POWs, this concern only grew. These events hastened the relief of the Rats of Tobruk, while the other divisions were immediately recalled to reinforce New Guinea. General conscription was reintroduced, though service was again limited to Australian possessions, which caused tension between the AIF and Militia. This was in addition to the CMF's perceived inferior fighting ability, with these grievances earning the Militia their nicknames of "koalas" and "chocos" or "chocolate soldiers".

The Imperial Japanese Navy's failure in the Battle of the Coral Sea, was the impetus for the Imperial Japanese Army to try to capture Port Moresby via the Owen Stanley Range. On 21 July 1942, the Japanese began the Kokoda Campaign after landing at Gona; attempts to defeat them by Australian battalions were met with eventual success. Resultant offensive operations concluded with the Japanese being driven out of New Guinea entirely. In parallel with these defences, the Battle of Milne Bay was waged, and when the Japanese were repulsed, it was considered their first significant reversal for the war. In November 1942, the campaign ended after the Japanese withdrawal, with Australian advances leading to the Battle of Buna–Gona.

In early 1943, the Salamaua–Lae campaign began, with operations against the entrenched Japanese aimed towards recapturing the eponymous towns. This culminated in the capture of Lae, held by the 7th Division in early September 1943, from a successful combined amphibious landing at Lae and an airborne landing at Nadzab. The seaborne assault was notable as it was the first large–scale amphibious operation since Gallipoli. Subsequently, Salamaua was taken days later on 11 September 1943, by a separate joint Australia–US attack. The Battle of Lae was additionally part of the wider Huon Peninsula campaign. Following Lae's capture, the Battle of Finschhafen commenced with a relatively swift control of objectives, with subsequent Japanese counterattacks beaten off. On 17 November 1943, a major offensive that began with the Battle of Sattelberg, continued with the Battle of Wareo, and concluded with the Battle of Sio on 15 January 1944, was unleashed. The momentum of this advance was continued by the 8th Brigade, as they pursued the enemy in retreat, which culminated with the Battle of Madang.

In mid-1944, Australian forces took over the garrisoning of Torokina from the US with this changeover giving Australian command responsibility over the Bougainville campaign. Soon after arriving in November of the same year, the commander of II Corps, Lieutenant-General Stanley Savige, began an offensive to retake the island with the 3rd Division alongside the 11th and 23rd Brigades. The campaign lasted until the Japanese surrender, with controversy surrounding its little apparent significance to the war's conclusion, and the number of casualties incurred; this was one of Australia's most costliest campaigns in the Second World War.

In October 1944, Australian participation in the Aitape–Wewak campaign began with the replacement of US forces at Aitape with the Australian 6th Division. US forces had previously captured the position, and had held it passively, though Australian command found this unsuitable. On 2 November 1944, the 2/6th Cavalry Commando Regiment was tasked with patrolling the area, wherein minor engagements were reported. In early December, the commandos were sent inland to establish access to the Torricelli Range, while the 19th Brigade handled patrolling, consequently, the amount of fierce fighting and territory secured increased. Following this success, thought was given for the capture of Maprik and Wewak, though supply became a major issue in this period. On 10 February 1945, the campaign's major offensive was underway, which resulted in both falling in quick succession on 22 April 1945. Smaller operations to secure the area continued, and all significant actions ceased by July.

The Borneo campaign was a series of three distinct amphibious operations that were undertaken by the 7th and 9th Divisions. The campaign began with the Battle of Tarakan on 1 May 1945, followed six weeks later by the Battle of Labuan, and concluded with the Battle of Balikpapan. The purpose of capturing Tarakan was to establish airfields, and the island was taken seven weeks following the initial amphibious landing. On 10 June 1945, the operation at Labuan commenced, and was tasked to secure resources and a naval base, and would continue until Japan's surrender. On 1 July 1945, the Balikpapan engagement commenced, with all its major objectives being acquired by war's end; this operation remains the largest amphibious operation undertaken by Australian forces, with 33,000 Australian servicemen participating. On 15 August 1945, Japan surrendered, ending the Second World War.

Cold War

Postwar 

After the surrender of Japan, Australia provided a contingent to the British Commonwealth Occupation Force (BCOF) which included the 34th Brigade. The units that composed the brigade would eventually become the nucleus of the regular army, with the battalions and brigade being renumbered to reflect this change. Following the start of the Korean War, the Australian Army committed troops to fight against the North Korean forces; the units came from the Australian contribution to BCOF. The 3rd Battalion, Royal Australian Regiment (3RAR) arrived in Pusan on 28 September 1950. Australian troop numbers would increase and continue to be deployed up until the armistice, with 3RAR being eventually joined by the 1st Battalion, Royal Australian Regiment (1RAR). For a brief period, between 1951 and 1959, the Menzies Government reinstituted conscription and compulsory military training with the National Service Scheme, which required all males of eighteen years of age to serve for specified period in either the Australian Regular Army (ARA) or CMF.

Irregular warfare 

In October 1955, the Australian Army committed the 2nd Battalion, Royal Australian Regiment (2RAR) in the Malayan Emergency, a guerrilla conflict between communist forces and the Federation of Malaya over ethnic Chinese citizenship. 
The operations consisted of patrolling actions and guarding infrastructure, though they rarely saw combat as the emergency was nearly over by the time of their deployment. All three original Royal Australian Regiment battalions would complete at least one tour before the end of operations. In August 1963, Australia ended deployments to Malaya, three years after the emergency's official end.

In 1962, the Borneo Confrontation began, due to Indonesia's opposition to the formation of Malaysia. It was an undeclared war that entailed a series of border conflicts between Indonesian-backed forces and British–Malaysian allies. Initial Australian support in the conflict began, and continued throughout, with the training and supply of Malaysian troops; Australian soldiers were only used for combat in defensive operations. In January 1965, permission was granted for the deployment of 3RAR, with extensive operations conducted in Sarawak from March until their withdrawal in July 1965. The subsequent deployment of 4th Battalion, Royal Australian Regiment (4RAR), in April 1966, was less intensive, with the battalion withdrawn in August. This is not to mention the efforts of several other corps and units in the conflict.

Vietnam War 

The Australian Army commenced its involvement in the Vietnam War by sending military advisors in 1962, which was then increased by sending in combat troops, specifically 1RAR, on 27 May 1965. Just before the official start of hostilities, the Australian Army was augmented with the reintroduction of conscription, which was based on a 'birthday ballot' selection process for all registered 20-year-old males. These men were required to register, unless they gave a legitimate reason for their exemption, else they faced penalties. This scheme would prove to be one of the most controversial implementations of conscription in Australia, with large protests against its adoption.

In March 1966, the Australian Army increased its commitment again with the replacement of 1RAR with the 1st Australian Task Force, a force in which all nine battalions of the Royal Australian Regiment would serve. One of the heaviest actions of the war occurred in August 1966, with the Battle of Long Tan, wherein D Company, 6th Battalion, Royal Australian Regiment (6RAR) successfully fended off an enemy force, estimated at 2,000 men, for four hours. In 1968, Australian forces defended against the Tet Offensive, a Viet Cong military operation, and repulsed them with few casualties. The contribution of personnel to the war was gradually wound down, starting in late-1970 and ending in 1972; the official declaration of the end of Australia's involvement in the war was made on 11 January 1973.

Post–Vietnam War 
Following the Vietnam War, there was a significant hiatus of operational activity by the Australian Army. In late 1979, in the largest deployment of the decade, the Army committed 151 troops to the Commonwealth Monitoring Force, which monitored the transition of Rhodesia to universal suffrage. A decade later in 1989, Australia deployed 300 army engineer personnel as the Australian contribution to the United Nations Transition Assistance Group in Namibia. The mission helped transition the country to independence from South African control.

Recent history (1990–present)

Peacekeeping 
Following the invasion of Kuwait by Iraq in August 1990, a coalition of countries sponsored by the United Nations Security Council, of which Australia was a part, gave a deadline for Iraq to withdraw from Kuwait of the 15 January 1991. Iraq refused to retreat and thus full conflict and the Gulf War began two days later on 17 January 1991. In January 1993, the Australian Army deployed 26 personnel on an ongoing rotational basis to the Multinational Force and Observers (MFO), as part of a non-United Nations peacekeeping organisation that observes and enforces the peace treaty between Israel and Egypt.

Australia's largest peacekeeping deployment began in 1999 with the International Force for East Timor, while other ongoing operations include peacekeeping in the Sinai (as part of MFO), and the United Nations Truce Supervision Organization (as part of Operation Paladin since 1956). Humanitarian relief after the 2004 Indian Ocean earthquake in Aceh Province, Indonesia, Operation Sumatra Assist, ended on 24 March 2005.

Afghanistan and Iraq 

Following the 11 September 2001 terrorist attacks, Australia promised troops to any military operations that the US commenced in response to the attacks. Subsequently, the Australian Army committed combat troops to Afghanistan in Operation Slipper. This combat role continued until the end of 2013 when it was replaced by a training contingent operating under Operation Highroad until 2021.

After the Gulf War the UN imposed heavy restrictions on Iraq to stop them producing any Weapon of mass destruction. In the early 21st century, the US accused Iraq of possessing these weapons and promoted unsubstantiated allegations, and requested that the UN invade the country in response, a motion which Australia supported. The UN denied this motion, however, it did not stop a coalition, that Australia joined, invading the country; thus starting the Iraq War on 19 March 2003.

Between April 2015 and June 2020, the Army deployed a 300-strong element to Iraq, designated as Task Group Taji, as part of Operation Okra. In support of a capacity building mission, Task Group Taji's main role was to provide training to Iraqi forces, during which Australian troops have served alongside counterparts from New Zealand.

Organisation

The 1st Division comprises a deployable headquarters, while the 2nd Division, under the command of Forces Command, is the main home-defence formation, containing Army Reserve units. The 2nd Division's headquarters only performs administrative functions. The Australian Army has not deployed a divisional-sized formation since 1945 and does not expect to do so in the future.

1st Division 
The 1st Division carries out high-level training activities and deploys to command large-scale ground operations. It has few combat units permanently assigned to it, although it does currently command the 2nd Battalion, Royal Australian Regiment as part of Australia's amphibious task group.

Forces Command 
Forces Command controls for administrative purposes all non-special-forces assets of the Australian Army. It is neither an operational nor a deployable command. Forces Command comprises:
 1 Brigade – Multi-role Combat Brigade based in Darwin.
 3 Brigade – Multi-role Combat Brigade based in Townsville.
 6 Brigade (CS&ISTAR) – Mixed brigade based in Sydney.
 7 Brigade – Multi-role Combat Brigade based in Brisbane.
 9 Brigade – Integrated Combat Brigade based in South Australia.
 17 Sustainment Brigade – Logistic brigade based in Sydney.

Additionally, Forces Command includes the following training establishments:
 Army Recruit Training Centre at Kapooka, NSW;
 Royal Military College, Duntroon in the ACT;
 Combined Arms Training Centre at Puckapunyal, Vic; and
 Army Logistic Training Centre at Bonegilla, Vic and Bandiana, Vic.

2nd Division 
Administers the reserve forces from its headquarters located in Sydney.

 4 Brigade – based in Victoria and Tasmania.
5 Brigade – based in New South Wales.
 8 Brigade – training brigade with units around Australia
 11 Brigade – based in Queensland.
 13 Brigade – based in Western Australia.

Aviation 
Army Aviation Command is responsible for the Australian Army's helicopters and training, aviation safety and unmanned aerial vehicles (UAV). Army Aviation Command comprises:
 16 Aviation Brigade – brigade based in Gallipoli Barracks at  Enoggera, Brisbane.
 Army Aviation Training Centre at Oakey, Queensland

Special Forces 
Special Operations Command is a command formation of equal status to the other commands in the ADF and includes all of Army's special forces units. Special Operations Command comprises:
 Special Forces Group - a brigade-level headquarters.

Colours, standards and guidons

Infantry, and some other combat units of the Australian Army carry flags called the Queen's Colour and the Regimental Colour, known as "the Colours". Armoured units carry Standards and Guidons – flags smaller than Colours and traditionally carried by Cavalry, Lancer, Light Horse and Mounted Infantry units. The 1st Armoured Regiment is the only unit in the Australian Army to carry a Standard, in the tradition of heavy armoured units. Artillery units' guns are considered to be their Colours, and on parade are provided with the same respect. Non-combat units (combat service support corps) do not have Colours, as Colours are battle flags and so are only available to combat units. As a substitute, many have Standards or Banners. Units awarded battle honours have them emblazoned on their Colours, Standards and Guidons. They are a link to the unit's past and a memorial to the fallen. Artillery do not have Battle Honours – their single Honour is "Ubique" which means "Everywhere" – although they can receive Honour Titles.

The Army is the guardian of the National Flag and as such, unlike the Royal Australian Air Force, does not have a flag or Colours. The Army, instead, has a banner, known as the Army Banner. To commemorate the centenary of the Army, the Governor General Sir William Deane, presented the Army with a new Banner at a parade in front of the Australian War Memorial on 10 March 2001. The banner was presented to the Regimental Sergeant Major of the Army (RSM-A), Warrant Officer Peter Rosemond.

The Army Banner bears the Australian Coat of Arms on the obverse, with the dates "1901–2001" in gold in the upper hoist. The reverse bears the "rising sun" badge of the Australian Army, flanked by seven campaign honours on small gold-edged scrolls: South Africa, World War I, World War II, Korea, Malaya-Borneo, South Vietnam, and Peacekeeping. The banner is trimmed with gold fringe, has gold and crimson cords and tassels, and is mounted on a pike with the usual British royal crest finial.

Personnel

Strength
As of June 2018 the Army had a strength of 47,338 personnel: 29,994 permanent (regular) and 17,346 active reservists (part-time); all of whom are volunteers. In addition, the Standby Reserve has another 12,496 members (as of 2009). As of 2018, women make up 14.3% of the Army – well on track to reach its current goal of 15% by 2023. The number of women in the Australian military has increased since 2011 (10%), with the announcement that women would be allowed to serve in frontline combat roles by 2016.

Rank and insignia

The ranks of the Australian Army are based on the ranks of the British Army, and carry mostly the same actual insignia. For officers the ranks are identical except for the shoulder title "Australia". The Non-Commissioned Officer insignia are the same up until Warrant Officer, where they are stylised for Australia (for example, using the Australian, rather than the British coat of arms).
The ranks of the Australian Army are as follows:

Uniforms 

The Australian Army uniforms are grouped into nine categories, with additional variants arranged into alphabetical suffixes, each ranging from ceremonial dress to general service to battle dress. The slouch hat is the regular service and general duties hat, while the field hat is for use near combat scenarios.

Equipment

Firearms and artillery

Vehicles

Support

Aircraft

Bases

The Army's operational headquarters, Forces Command, is located at Victoria Barracks in Sydney. The Australian Army's three regular brigades are based at Robertson Barracks near Darwin, Lavarack Barracks in Townsville, and Gallipoli Barracks in Brisbane. The Deployable Joint Force Headquarters is also located at Gallipoli Barracks.

Other important Army bases include the Army Aviation Centre near Oakey, Queensland, Holsworthy Barracks near Sydney, Lone Pine Barracks in Singleton, New South Wales and Woodside Barracks near Adelaide, South Australia. The SASR is based at Campbell Barracks Swanbourne, a suburb of Perth, Western Australia.

Puckapunyal, north of Melbourne, houses the Australian Army's Combined Arms Training Centre, Land Warfare Development Centre, and three of the five principal Combat Arms schools. Further barracks include Steele Barracks in Sydney, Keswick Barracks in Adelaide, and Irwin Barracks at Karrakatta in Perth. Dozens of Australian Army Reserve depots are located across Australia.

Australian Army Journal
Since June 1948, the Australian Army has published its own journal titled the Australian Army Journal. The journal's first editor was Colonel Eustace Keogh, and initially, it was intended to assume the role that the Army Training Memoranda had filled during the Second World War, although its focus, purpose, and format has shifted over time. Covering a broad range of topics including essays, book reviews and editorials, with submissions from serving members as well as professional authors, the journal's stated goal is to provide "...the primary forum for Army's professional discourse... [and]... debate within the Australian Army... [and improve the]... intellectual rigor of that debate by adhering to a strict and demanding standard of quality". In 1976, the journal was placed on hiatus as the Defence Force Journal began publication; however, publishing of the Australian Army Journal began again in 1999 and since then the journal has been published largely on a quarterly basis, with only minimal interruptions.

See also

 Australian Defence Force ranks and insignia
 Australian military slang
 Battle and theatre honours of the Australian Army
 Conscription in Australia
 List of Australian Army units
 List of Australian military memorials
List of military weapons of Australia

References

Citations

Notes

Bibliography

Further reading

 
 
 

 
1901 establishments in Australia
Cold War history of Australia